Nandito Ako (lit. I Am Here) is the fifth studio album by Mexican singer Thalía, released on 28 January 1997, by EMI Latin and OctoArts EMI. The album was released exclusively in the Philippines, where she gained a following after the success of the soap opera Marimar in the country. The title track in the album was originally performed by Lea Salonga. Nandito Ako was a success in the Philippines and received three times platinum award there, making its one of the best-selling albums in the Philippines. Ten years later, it was re-released in the Philippines with the inclusion of one of her signature songs "Marimar".

Background and composition 
The album was sung half in English and half in Tagalog. Ricky R. Ilacad is its executive producer. Due to Thalía's success in the Philippines, this album was released in 1997 in that country and other Asian countries, under the label OctoArts EMI. This was the first time Thalía sang in English and Tagalog. With this album, Thalía became the first and only Latin artist with an album recorded primarily in Tagalog. It also features five songs from Thalía's fourth studio album, En éxtasis (1995), four of which were translated from Spanish; "María la del Barrio" & "Juana" was translated into Tagalog, while "Quiero Hacerte El Amor" and "Gracias a Dios" were translated into English. "Amándote" retained its Spanish lyrics, but was remixed. She also made her own covers of the songs "Tell Me" (originally performed by Joey Albert), "Hey, It's Me" (originally by Jamie Rivera), and "El Venao" (originally by Los Cantantes). Some of the tracks that were previously released in Latin America and re-recorded for this album still retain some of the Spanish lyrics and backing vocals (except for "El Venao"/"Chika Lang" which has a new instrumental and backing vocals in Tagalog). The album, composed of ten tracks, includes her first single "Nandito Ako" which was recorded after her major concert in the Philippines.

Commercial reception
The album sold 40,000 in Philippines, after the first week of its release. Eventually, it received three times platinum award there, making its one of the best-selling albums in the Philippines.

Track listing

Certifications

Personnel
Producers: Oscar Lopez, Emilio Estefan Jr., Kike Santander and Juan Zambrano
Executive Producer: Ricky Ilacad
Musical Arrangers: Amaury Lopez, Robby Martinez, Didi Gutman, Kike Santander and Juan Zambrano
A & R Coordinator for EMI Mexico: Hector Martinez
A & R Coordinator for EMI Philippines: Bob Guzman
Cover Design: Willie Monzon and Allan Roldan

References

1997 compilation albums
Thalía compilation albums
Albums produced by Emilio Estefan
EMI Latin compilation albums
Tagalog-language compilation albums